Cold Brook may refer to:

Places

Canada
 Coldbrook, Nova Scotia, a community

United States
 Cold Brook, New York, a village in Herkimer County, New York
 Cold Brook (Black River), a river in Lewis County, New York
 Cold Brook (Oneida County, New York), a river in Oneida County, New York
 Cold Brook Feed Mill, a historic grist mill, in Herkimer County, New York
 Cold Brook Dam, a dam in Fall River County, South Dakota
 Cold Brook Township, Warren County, Illinois, in Warren County, Illinois
 Coldbrook, Illinois, an unincorporated community, in Warren County, Illinois

Other
 Cold Brook (film), a 2018 film directed by and starring William Fichtner